Series 7 of Top Gear, a British motoring magazine and factual television programme, was broadcast in the United Kingdom on BBC Two during 2005, consisting of six episodes between 13 October and 27 December. This series' highlights included a race involving the Bugatti Veyron, and a motoring challenge involving budget second-hand supercars. After the series concluded it was followed by a "Winter Olympics" special, featuring the presenters doing their own version of sporting events with cars, which aired on 12 February 2006, and a compilation series titled "Best of Top Gear" aired that same year between 13 March and 4 April, featuring the involvement of Jimmy Carr in one episode.

Episodes

Compilation Episodes

References

2005 British television seasons
2006 British television seasons
Top Gear seasons